The Oyashio class is a series of Japanese diesel-electric attack submarines operated by the JMSDF. The submarines entered service in the late 1990s. The submarines are larger than the earlier , to provide space for a flank sonar array.

Boats
There are a total of 11 boats in the class - the last boat was commissioned in 2008. Oyashio, Michishio, and Kuroshio share their names with World War II destroyers. Takashio shares a name with a ship from the third set of s, of which none were built.

The first two boats, Oyashio and Michishio, have since been converted to training platforms.

On February 1, 2018, the Ministry of Defence's Maritime Staff Office revealed that seven of the service's  Oyashio-class submarines, which have a surface displacement of 2,800 tonnes – have already completed service-life extension work to date. The seven boats received extensive refits during their second and third maintenance cycles, which have been planned to bring the vessels to "almost the same level of that of the latest model , while extending their service lives.

Gallery

See also
 List of submarine classes in service

References

External links

Oyashio class entry at GlobalSecurity

Submarine classes
 
 
Oyashio class
Auxiliary training ship classes